Elections to Banbridge District Council were held on 5 May 2005 on the same day as the other Northern Irish local government elections. The election used three district electoral areas to elect a total of 17 councillors.

Election results

Note: "Votes" are the first preference votes.

Districts summary

|- class="unsortable" align="centre"
!rowspan=2 align="left"|Ward
! % 
!Cllrs
! % 
!Cllrs
! %
!Cllrs
! %
!Cllrs
! % 
!Cllrs
! %
!Cllrs
!rowspan=2|TotalCllrs
|- class="unsortable" align="center"
!colspan=2 bgcolor="" | DUP
!colspan=2 bgcolor="" | UUP
!colspan=2 bgcolor="" | SDLP
!colspan=2 bgcolor="" | Sinn Féin
!colspan=2 bgcolor="" | Alliance
!colspan=2 bgcolor="white"| Others
|-
|align="left"|Banbridge Town
|32.8
|2
|bgcolor="40BFF5"|38.3
|bgcolor="40BFF5"|2
|19.9
|1
|0.0
|0
|9.0
|1
|0.0
|0
|6
|-
|align="left"|Dromore
|bgcolor="#D46A4C"|49.8
|bgcolor="#D46A4C"|3
|31.3
|1
|11.8
|1
|7.1
|0
|0.0
|0
|0.0
|0
|5
|-
|align="left"|Knockiveagh
|bgcolor="#D46A4C"|33.2
|bgcolor="#D46A4C"|2
|27.8
|2
|15.7
|1
|11.3
|1
|4.5
|0
|7.5
|0
|6
|- class="unsortable" class="sortbottom" style="background:#C9C9C9"
|align="left"| Total
|38.3
|7
|32.4
|5
|15.9
|3
|6.3
|1
|4.5
|1
|2.6
|0
|17
|-
|}

Districts results

Banbridge Town

2001: 3 x UUP, 1 x DUP, 1 x SDLP, 1 x Alliance
2005: 2 x UUP, 2 x DUP, 1 x SDLP, 1 x Alliance
2001-2005 Change: DUP gain from UUP

Dromore

2001: 2 x DUP, 2 x UUP, 1 x SDLP
2005: 3 x DUP, 1 x UUP, 1 x SDLP
2001-2005 Change: DUP gain from UUP

Knockiveagh

2001: 2 x UUP, 2 x DUP, 1 x SDLP, 1 x Independent
2005: 3 x UUP, 1 x DUP, 1 x SDLP, 1 x Sinn Féin
2001-2005 Change: Sinn Féin gain from Independent

References

Banbridge District Council elections
Banbridge